Jacob Thompson (1810–1885) was the United States Secretary of the Interior and later the Inspector General of the Confederate States Army.

Jacob or Jake Thompson may also refer to:

 Jacob Thompson (painter) (1806–1879), English landscape painter
 Jacob Gordon Thompson, Georgia State Patrol officer charged with the killing of Julian Edward Roosevelt Lewis in 2020
 Jake Thompson (born 1994), American baseball pitcher

Other uses
 Jacob Thompson House, located in Monson, Massachusetts

See also
 Jake Thomson (born 1989), English footballer
 J. Thompson Baker (1847–1919), American Democratic Party politician from New Jersey
 Martín Jacobo Thompson (1777–1819), Argentine patriot